The Escape is the 15th book in the Animorphs series, written by K.A. Applegate. It is narrated by Marco.

The cover quote reads, "The Yeerks are out there...."

Plot summary

The book starts off with the four human Animorphs helping four parrots in a new mall cafe by telling the customers disgusting things  about the cafe's food. After this, Marco's old acquaintance, Erek King, who was watching at the room's back, has some disturbing news about his mother, Eva (Visser One). She has returned to Earth, overseeing a Yeerk bio-weapons program to allow them to venture into deep waters; this is a requirement made by the Yeerk command for the invasion of Leera, a planet covered almost entirely by oceans. The research is conducted in the waters around Royan Island. The Animorphs infiltrate the facility, and discover that the Yeerks are trying to create super-intelligent sharks which can be infested and controlled, because in their natural state, the sharks' brains are not big enough. They decide to acquire hammerhead morphs. Marco accidentally reveals to the other Animorphs his fear of sharks. While scouting the waters off Royan Island, the Animorphs are captured by a computer while morphed as sharks. They have devices installed in them designed to bestow sentience on animals. The Animorphs then try to morph flies, but find they can no longer morph into small creatures because the devices are too large for small creatures' brains. They realize the only way to remove them is to destroy the facility, deciding to attempt to do so. During the ensuing battle, Marco reveals to Rachel and Ax that Visser One's host body is his mother, just as they were about to kill her. Visser Three storms in, angry that Visser One would do these experiments without his knowledge or consent, and they have an argument. Visser Three is about to eat Ax in a snake-like alien morph, but Rachel intervenes and grabs him by his wrist in bear morph, threatening to cut him in half. Because of this, Marco sees an opportunity and morphs into a gorilla, knocking out the Visser.

The Yeerks have just captured some new specimens of aquatic species - known as Leerans. The Leerans are capable of telepathy and limited mind-reading capacity, hence the Yeerks' attempts to endow the sharks with sentience - a secret invasion is impractical due to the Leeran mind-reading abilities. A possibly infested Leeran states to Visser One that Marco (still in gorilla morph) is human. Visser One, however, misunderstands and thinks it's saying that the morph is a human. Marco knocks the Leeran unconscious before it can explain what it meant. The Animorphs know that the Yeerks must be stopped before they can utilize two new powerful living weapons. They destroy the factory and escape unscathed.

Marco's mother may or may not be dead. She was unconscious when the flooding started, but a Leeran was seen swimming toward her and the Animorphs heard a torpedo being expulsed, which may have carried her to safety.

Morphs

References

Animorphs books
1998 American novels
1998 science fiction novels
Underwater novels